A garden is a planned space, usually outdoors, set aside for the cultivation, display, and enjoyment of plants and other forms of nature. The single feature identifying even the wildest wild garden is control. The garden can incorporate both natural and artificial materials.

Gardens often have design features including statuary, follies, pergolas, trellises, stumperies, dry creek beds, and water features such as fountains, ponds (with or without fish), waterfalls or creeks. Some gardens are for ornamental purposes only, while others also produce food crops, sometimes in separate areas, or sometimes intermixed with the ornamental plants. Food-producing gardens are distinguished from farms by their smaller scale, more labor-intensive methods, and their purpose (enjoyment of a hobby or self-sustenance rather than producing for sale, as in a market garden). Flower gardens combine plants of different heights, colors, textures, and fragrances to create interest and delight the senses.

The most common form today is a residential or public garden, but the term garden has traditionally been a more general one. Zoos, which display wild animals in simulated natural habitats, were formerly called zoological gardens. Western gardens are almost universally based on plants, with garden, which etymologically implies enclosure, often signifying a shortened form of botanical garden. Some traditional types of eastern gardens, such as Zen gardens, however, use plants sparsely or not at all. Landscape gardens, on the other hand, such as the English landscape gardens first developed in the 18th century, may omit flowers altogether.

Landscape architecture is a related professional activity with landscape architects tending to engage in design at many scales and working on both public and private projects.

Etymology
The etymology of the word gardening refers to enclosure: it is from Middle English gardin, from Anglo-French gardin, jardin, of Germanic origin; akin to Old High German gard, gart, an enclosure or compound, as in Stuttgart. See Grad (Slavic settlement) for more complete etymology. The words yard, court, and Latin hortus (meaning "garden", hence horticulture and orchard), are cognates—all referring to an enclosed space.

The term "garden" in British English refers to a small enclosed area of land, usually adjoining a building. This would be referred to as a yard in American English.

Uses

A garden can have aesthetic, functional, and recreational uses:
 Cooperation with nature
 Plant cultivation
 Garden-based learning
 Observation of nature
 Bird- and insect-watching
 Reflection on the changing seasons
 Relaxation
 Family dinners on the terrace
 Children playing in the garden
 Reading and relaxing in a hammock
 Maintaining the flowerbeds
 Pottering in the shed
 Cottaging in the bushes
 Basking in warm sunshine
 Escaping oppressive sunlight and heat
 Growing useful produce
 Flowers to cut and bring inside for indoor beauty
 Fresh herbs and vegetables for cooking

History

Asia

China 

The earliest recorded Chinese gardens were created in the valley of the Yellow River, during the Shang Dynasty (1600–1046 BC). These gardens were large enclosed parks where the kings and nobles hunted game, or where fruit and vegetables were grown. Early inscriptions from this period, carved on tortoise shells, have three Chinese characters for garden, you, pu and yuan. You was a royal garden where birds and animals were kept, while pu was a garden for plants. During the Qin dynasty (221–206 BC), yuan became the character for all gardens. The old character for yuan is a small picture of a garden; it is enclosed in a square which can represent a wall, and has symbols which can represent the plan of a structure, a small square which can represent a pond, and a symbol for a plantation or a pomegranate tree.

A famous royal garden of the late Shang dynasty was the Terrace, Pond and Park of the Spirit (Lingtai, Lingzhao Lingyou) built by King Wenwang west of his capital city, Yin. The park was described in the Classic of Poetry this way:

The King makes his promenade in the Park of the Spirit,
The deer are kneeling on the grass, feeding their fawns,
The deer are beautiful and resplendent.
The immaculate cranes have plumes of a brilliant white.
The King makes his promenade to the Pond of the Spirit,
The water is full of fish, who wriggle.

Another early royal garden was Shaqui, or the Dunes of Sand, built by the last Shang ruler, King Zhou (1075–1046 BC). It was composed of an earth terrace, or tai, which served as an observation platform in the center of a large square park. It was described in one of the early classics of Chinese literature, the Records of the Grand Historian (Shiji). According to the Shiji, one of the most famous features of this garden was the Wine Pool and Meat Forest (酒池肉林). A large pool, big enough for several small boats, was constructed on the palace grounds, with inner linings of polished oval shaped stones from the seashore. The pool was then filled with wine. A small island was constructed in the middle of the pool, where trees were planted, which had skewers of roasted meat hanging from their branches. King Zhou and his friends and concubines drifted in their boats, drinking the wine with their hands and eating the roasted meat from the trees. Later Chinese philosophers and historians cited this garden as an example of decadence and bad taste.

During the Spring and Autumn period (722–481 BC), in 535 BC, the Terrace of Shanghua, with lavishly decorated palaces, was built by King Jing of the Zhou dynasty. In 505 BC, an even more elaborate garden, the Terrace of Gusu, was begun. It was located on the side of a mountain, and included a series of terraces connected by galleries, along with a lake where boats in the form of blue dragons navigated. From the highest terrace, a view extended as far as Lake Tai, the Great Lake.

India 
Manasollasa is a twelfth century Sanskrit text that offers details on garden design and a variety of other subjects. Both public parks and woodland gardens are described, with about 40 types of trees recommended for the park in the Vana-krida chapter. Shilparatna, a text from the sixteenth century, states that flower gardens or public parks should be located in the northern portion of a town.

Japan 

The earliest recorded Japanese gardens were the pleasure gardens of the Emperors and nobles. In spring 74 CE, the chronicle recorded: "The Emperor Keikō put a few carp into a pond, and rejoiced to see them morning and evening". The following year, "The Emperor launched a double-hulled boat in the pond of Ijishi at Ihare, and went aboard with his imperial concubine, and they feasted sumptuously together". In 486, the chronicle recorded that "The Emperor Kenzō went into the garden and feasted at the edge of a winding stream".

Korea 

Korean gardens are a type of garden described as being natural, informal, simple and unforced, seeking to merge with the natural world. They have a history that goes back more than two thousand years, but are little known in the west. The oldest records date to the Three Kingdoms period (57 BC – 668 AD) when architecture and palace gardens showed a development noted in the Korean History of the Three Kingdoms.

Europe 

Gardening was not recognized as an art form in Europe until the mid 16th century when it entered the political discourse, as a symbol of the concept of the "ideal republic". Evoking utopian imagery of the Garden of Eden, a time of abundance and plenty where humans didn't know hunger or the conflicts that arose from property disputes. John Evelyn wrote in the early 17th century, "there is not a more laborious life then is that of a good Gard'ners; but a labour full of tranquility and satisfaction; Natural and Instructive, and such as (if any) contributes to Piety and Contemplation." During the era of Enclosures, the agrarian collectivism of the feudal age was idealized in literary "fantasies of liberating regression to garden and wilderness".

France 
Following his campaign in Italy in 1495, where he saw the gardens and castles of Naples, King Charles VIII brought Italian craftsmen and garden designers, such as Pacello da Mercogliano, from Naples and ordered the construction of Italian-style gardens at his residence at the Château d'Amboise and at Château Gaillard, another private résidence in Amboise. His successor Henry II, who had also travelled to Italy and had met Leonardo da Vinci, created an Italian nearby at the Château de Blois. Beginning in 1528, King Francis I created new gardens at the Château de Fontainebleau, which featured fountains, parterres, a forest of pine trees brought from Provence, and the first artificial grotto in France. The Château de Chenonceau had two gardens in the new style, one created for Diane de Poitiers in 1551, and a second for Catherine de' Medici in 1560. In 1536, the architect Philibert de l'Orme, upon his return from Rome, created the gardens of the Château d'Anet following the Italian rules of proportion. The carefully prepared harmony of Anet, with its parterres and surfaces of water integrated with sections of greenery, became one of the earliest and most influential examples of the classic French garden.

The French formal garden contrasted with the design principles of the English landscape garden namely, to "force nature" instead of leaving it undisturbed. Typical French formal gardens had "parterres, geometrical shapes and neatly clipped topiary", in contrast to the English style of garden in which "plants and shrubs seem to grow naturally without artifice." By the mid-17th century axial symmetry had ascended to prominence in the French gardening traditions of Andre Mollet and Jacques Boyceau, the latter who wrote: "All things, however beautiful they may be chosen, will be defective if they are not ordered and placed in proper symmetry." A good example of the French formal style are the Tuileries gardens in Paris. Originally designed during the reign of King Henry II in the mid-sixteenth century, the gardens were redesigned into the formal French style for the Sun King Louis XIV. The gardens were ordered into symmetrical lines: long rows of elm or chestnut trees, clipped hedgerows, along with parterres, "reflect[ing] the orderly triumph of man's will over nature."

The French landscape garden was influenced by the English landscape garden and gained prominence in the late eighteenth century.

United Kingdom 
Before the Grand Manner era, what few significant gardens could be found in Britain had developed under influence from the continent. Britain's homegrown domestic gardening traditions were mostly practical in purpose, rather than aesthetic, unlike the grand gardens found mostly on castle grounds, and less commonly at universities. Tudor gardens emphasized contrast rather than transitions, distinguished by color and illusion. They were not intended as a complement to home or architecture, but conceived as independent spaces, arranged to grow and display flowers and ornamental plants. Gardeners demonstrated their artistry in knot gardens, with complex arrangements most commonly included interwoven box hedges, and less commonly fragrant herbs like rosemary. Sanded paths run between the hedgings of open knots whereas closed knots were filled with single colored flowers. The knot and parterre gardens were always placed on level ground, and elevated areas reserved for terraces from which the intricacy of the gardens could be viewed.

Jacobean gardens were described as "a delightful confusion" by Henry Wotton in 1624. Under the influence of the Italian Renaissance, Caroline gardens began to shed some of the chaos of earlier designs, marking the beginning of a trends towards symmetrical unified designs that took the building architecture into account, and featuring an elevated terrace from which home and garden could be viewed. The only surviving Caroline garden is located at Bolsover Castle in Derbyshire, but is too simple to attract much interest. During the reign of Charles II, many new Baroque style country houses were built; while in England Thomas Cromwell sought to destroy many Tudor, Jacobean and Caroline style gardens.

Design

Garden design is the process of creating plans for the layout and planting of gardens and landscapes. Gardens may be designed by garden owners themselves, or by professionals. Professional garden designers tend to be trained in principles of design and horticulture, and have a knowledge and experience of using plants. Some professional garden designers are also landscape architects, a more formal level of training that usually requires an advanced degree and often an occupational license.

Elements of garden design include the layout of hard landscape, such as paths, rockeries, walls, water features, sitting areas and decking, as well as the plants themselves, with consideration for their horticultural requirements, their season-to-season appearance, lifespan, growth habit, size, speed of growth, and combinations with other plants and landscape features. Most gardens consist of a mix of natural and constructed elements, although even very 'natural' gardens are always an inherently artificial creation. Natural elements present in a garden principally comprise flora (such as trees and weeds), fauna (such as arthropods and birds), soil, water, air and light. Constructed elements include paths, patios, decking, sculptures, drainage systems, lights and buildings (such as sheds, gazebos, pergolas and follies), but also living constructions such as flower beds, ponds and lawns.

Consideration is also given to the maintenance needs of the garden. Including the time or funds available for regular maintenance, (this can affect the choices of plants regarding speed of growth) spreading or self-seeding of the plants (annual or perennial), bloom-time, and many other characteristics. Garden design can be roughly divided into two groups, formal and naturalistic gardens. The most important consideration in any garden design is how the garden will be used, followed closely by the desired stylistic genres, and the way the garden space will connect to the home or other structures in the surrounding areas. All of these considerations are subject to the limitations of the budget. Budget limitations can be addressed by a simpler garden style with fewer plants and less costly hard landscape materials, seeds rather than sod for lawns, and plants that grow quickly; alternatively, garden owners may choose to create their garden over time, area by area.

Types

Environmental impact

Gardeners may cause environmental damage by the way they garden, or they may enhance their local environment.
Damage by gardeners can include direct destruction of natural habitats when houses and gardens are created; indirect habitat destruction and damage to provide garden materials such as peat, rock for rock gardens, and by the use of tapwater to irrigate gardens; the death of living beings in the garden itself, such as the killing not only of slugs and snails but also their predators such as hedgehogs and song thrushes by metaldehyde slug killer; the death of living beings outside the garden, such as local species extinction by indiscriminate plant collectors; and climate change caused by greenhouse gases produced by gardening.

Climate change
Gardeners can help to prevent climate change in many ways, including the use of trees, shrubs, ground cover plants and other perennial plants in their gardens, turning garden waste into soil organic matter instead of burning it, keeping soil and compost heaps aerated, avoiding peat, switching from power tools to hand tools or changing their garden design so that power tools are not needed, and using nitrogen-fixing plants instead of nitrogen fertiliser.

Climate change will have many impacts on gardens; some studies suggest most of them will be negative. Gardens also contribute to climate change. Greenhouse gases can be produced by gardeners in many ways. The three main greenhouse gases are carbon dioxide, methane, and nitrous oxide. Gardeners produce carbon dioxide directly by overcultivating soil and destroying soil carbon, by burning garden waste on bonfires, by using power tools which burn fossil fuel or use electricity generated by fossil fuels, and by using peat. Gardeners produce methane by compacting the soil and making it anaerobic, and by allowing their compost heaps to become compacted and anaerobic. Gardeners produce nitrous oxide by applying excess nitrogen fertiliser when plants are not actively growing so that the nitrogen in the fertiliser is converted by soil bacteria to nitrous oxide.

Irrigation

Some gardeners manage their gardens without using any water from outside the garden. Examples in Britain include Ventnor Botanic Garden on the Isle of Wight, and parts of Beth Chatto's garden in Essex, Sticky Wicket garden in Dorset, and the Royal Horticultural Society's gardens at Harlow Carr and Hyde Hall.
Rain gardens absorb rainfall falling onto nearby hard surfaces, rather than sending it into stormwater drains.

See also 

 Index of gardening articles
 Outline of organic gardening and farming
 List of professional gardeners
 List of horticulture and gardening books/publications

References

Works cited

External links

 

 
Landscape